Sergio Tang is an educator and marketer from Lima, Peru.

Tang completed his BBA from Saint Ignatius of Loyola University in 2014 and his MBA from Esade (Spain) in 2019.

In 2015, Tang founded Coowit, a social platform to connect people attending the same event or function. In 2016, he founded Beefup, a consultancy based on digital marketing.

From 2017 to 2020, he served as the marketing director at Fandango Latam. Before this in 2017, he also worked as the digital manager at IPG Mediabrands. Tang is serving as the chief growth officer of Vivela (previously miCasita Hipotecaria), a financial company from Peru.

Tang is a lecturer at the University of Sciences and Arts of Latin America in the design strategy Master's course. He is also a guest lecturer at the Scientific University of the South in digital marketing. Tang is a member of the Forbes Technology Council.

References

Living people
Year of birth missing (living people)